Beşdam (also, Bəşdam) is a village and municipality in the Siazan Rayon of Azerbaijan.  It has a population of 691.  The municipality consists of the villages of Beşdam, Dərə Zarat, Nardaran, and Siyəzən.

References 

Populated places in Siyazan District